The Welshpool and Llanfair Light Railway (W&LLR) is a   narrow gauge heritage railway in Powys, Wales.

History

Early proposals
The first proposal to connect Llanfair Caerinion and Welshpool by railway was the Llanfair Railway of 1864; this would have been a narrow gauge line, with a mixed gauge section where it connected to the Cambrian Railways. This proposal was abandoned. The next attempt came in 1876 with the promotion of the Welshpool and Llanfair Railway Bill, which proposed a railway along a similar route to the 1864 effort. This Bill passed through the Houses of Parliament. This attempt failed in 1882 because the promoters were unable to raise sufficient capital. In 1886, another Welshpool and Llanfair Railway Bill appeared for a  gauge railway on a similar route; this bill expired unused in 1892.

The Light Railways Act of 1896 
In 1896, the Light Railways Act was passed, and this spurred further attempts at a railway to Llanfair Caereinion. The first of these was the Llanfair & Meifod Valley Light Railway bill of 1896, which proposed a standard-gauge line from Arddleen about 8 miles north of Welshpool, through the Meifod Valley.

In late December 1896, the mayor of Welshpool William Addie proposed a  gauge railway called the Welshpool and Llanfair Light Railway. By March 1897, Addie had contracted with noted narrow gauge promoter Everard Calthrop to assist in preparing a case for the inquiry. An application for a Light Railway Order was submitted to the Board of Trade in May 1897. Calthrop proposed the use of transporter wagons, 0-6-0 tank locomotives and a large "Barsi-type" locomotive for heavy market day traffic. At the August 1897 public inquiry Calthrop appeared, along with J.R. Dix manager of the Corris Railway. The enquiry considered both the Llanfair & Meifod Light Railway and the Welshpool and Llanfair Light Railway proposals. The commissioners took their time deciding. Meanwhile, the promoters of the W&LLR had approached the Cambrian Railways to have them pay for and construct the railway. After much time-consuming negotiations, the Cambrian agreed and on 8th. September 1899, the Light Railway Order was granted to begin construction of the line.

Original operations

It was opened on 6 April 1903 to aid economic development in a remote area, never making a profit. It was originally operated by the Cambrian Railways, connecting with it at the former Oswestry and Newtown Railway station in the town of Welshpool. The line is built through difficult country, having a great number of curves in order to reach the summit of 600 ft. The original terminus at Welshpool was located alongside the main line station and trains wound their way through the town, using the locomotive bell as a warning.

In the 1923 Grouping of railway companies, Cambrian Railways, including the Welshpool to Llanfair Caereinion line, was absorbed by the Great Western Railway (GWR). On 9 February 1931 the line lost its passenger service, which was replaced by a bus service, and it became a freight-only line. It was temporarily re-opened to passengers between 6 and 11 August 1945 for the Eisteddfod. The GWR itself was nationalised in 1948 and became part of British Railways.

Freight traffic lingered on until 1956, by which time British Railways decided to close the line, with services ceasing on 5 November.

Preservation

A group of volunteers and enthusiasts took the line over and started raising money to restore it. On 6 April 1963, the western half of the line, from Llanfair Caereinion to Castle Caereinion, was reopened as a Heritage railway. 

On 13 December 1964, a pier supporting the steel girder bridge over the River Banwy was seriously damaged by flood waters dislodging the bridge. During the spring and early summer of 1965 the 16th Railway Regiment of the Royal Engineers replaced the damaged masonry pier with a fabricated steel one and restored the span to its original position. Train services between Llanfair Caereinion to Castle Caereinion resumed on 14 August 1965.

In 1972, services were extended to Sylfaen. The line through Welshpool, however, could not be reopened, so the line now has a new terminus station at Raven Square on the western outskirts of the town, opened on 18 July 1981.
In 2008, there were discussions with Welshpool Town Council about reinstating the link through the town to the main line station, following a different route from that originally used.

Because of the   gauge, unusual for British narrow gauge railways, locomotives and rolling stock to supplement the originals have had to be obtained from sources around the world including the Zillertalbahn in Austria. A major grant from the Heritage Lottery Fund permitted restoration of both original locomotives together with several coaches and original wagons, and provision of new workshop facilities, ready for the line's centenary.

Golfa Bank
Golfa Bank is a particularly steep bank on the railway. The bank is nearly a mile at 1 in 29, which in its day, was the steepest section of the Cambrian Railways worked by passenger trains and is still a challenging climb. The line travelling up the slope is curvy, to make the climb easier. Golfa summit is 630 ft above sea level, meaning the locomotives have to travel from about 350 ft above sea level at the bottom of Golfa Bank, equal to climbing 280 ft in 1.5 miles. The locomotives had to be built specifically to manage the bank, due to its steepness.

There was a halt at the top called Golfa Halt, 1.75 miles or 3.2 km from the Welshpool Raven Square terminus. The halt had a loop that was provided for goods traffic. The station was opened on 6 April 1903.

The Great Western Railway withdrew passenger services on 9 February 1931, and the line closed completely on 3 November 1956. The station officially reopened on 18 July 1981, but was closed again by 2015.

Locomotives

Locomotives of the preserved railway

* = Name added by WLLR

Locomotives on hire

Former locomotives

* = Name added by WLLR

Passenger carriages

Carriages of the preserved railway

Coordinates
Welshpool station: 
Llanfair station:

See also
British narrow gauge railways
Welshpool Seven Stars Halt railway station

References

Bibliography
 
  
 Rushton, Gordon (2015). The Welshpool & Llanfair Railway  Travellers's Guide. Llanfair Caereinion : Welshpool & Llanfair Railway.

External links

The Weshpool & Llanfair Railway's website
The Welshpool & Llanfair Light Railway - an online photo album
W&LLR YouTube Channel

 
Heritage railways in Powys
2 ft 6 in gauge railways in Wales
Cambrian Railways
Great Western Railway constituents
Narrow gauge railways in Powys
Street running
Railway lines opened in 1903
Light railways
Welshpool